The 1911–12 season is the 2nd season of competitive football by Ayr United.

Competitions

Friendly and Benefit Matches

Scottish Second Division

Matches

Scottish Qualifying Cup

Scottish Cup

Ayrshire Cup

Ayr Charity Cup

Statistics

League table

Results by round

References

Ayr United F.C. seasons
Ayr United